Charles Derbyshire, born January 17, 1880, in Huntington, West Virginia, was an American translator active around the turn of the twentieth century. His most famous translations were of the poetry and novels of the Filipino writer and political activist Jose Rizal, Noli Me Tangere and El Filibusterismo, both of which were published in 1912. He also translated Rizal's farewell poem, posthumously titled Mi Ultimo Adios, which he published in 1911. Charles Derbyshire died April 10, 1933, in Chillicotte, Ohio.

External links
 
 

Spanish–English translators
American translators
Year of death missing
Year of birth missing